Bodybuilding at the 2010 Asian Beach Games was held in Muscat, Oman from 10 December to 11 December 2010. The competition included only men's events for six different weight categories. All events were held at Qurum City Auditorium.

Medalists

Medal table

Results

60 kg
10 December

Pre-judging

Final

 Kamil Al-Muqaimi of Oman originally got the 5th place, but was disqualified after he failed the drug test.

65 kg
10 December

Pre-judging

Final

 Hasan Jakhir of Iraq originally got the 4th place, but was disqualified after he failed the drug test.

70 kg
10 December

Pre-judging

Final

75 kg
11 December

Pre-judging

Final

 Nasser Al-Maskari of Oman originally won the silver medal, but was disqualified after he failed the drug test.

80 kg
11 December

Pre-judging

Final

 Anwar Al-Balushi of Oman originally won the silver medal, but was disqualified after he failed the drug test.
 Waleed Al-Hassani of Oman originally won the bronze medal, but was disqualified after he failed the drug test.

85 kg
11 December

Pre-judging

Final

References

Results

External links
 Official site

2010 Asian Beach Games events
2010
Bodybuilding competitions in Oman
2010 in bodybuilding